Cheshmeh-ye Sang Band is a village in Mohammadabad Rural District, in the Central District of Marvdasht County, Fars Province, Iran. At the 2006 census, its population was 30, in 7 families.

References 

Populated places in Marvdasht County